Clan MacDonald of Largie, also known as Clan Ranald Bane, is a Scottish clan and a branch of Clan Donald. The founder of the MacDonalds of Largie is Ranald Bane MacDonald, a son of Iain Mhoir Tanistear Mic Dhòmhnaill (John Mor Tanister MacDonald) and Margery Byset (Margaret Bisset).

History
Ranald Bane was granted lands in Kintyre around Largie by his brother Donald Ballach MacDonald, Chief of Clan MacDonald of Dunnyveg.

In 1647 at the Battle of Rhunahaorine Moss, during the Wars of the Three Kingdoms, the MacDonalds of Largie were routed and Largie Castle at Rhunahaorine was destroyed. Their lands and estate were forfeited and given to Archibald Campbell of Inverawe. The lands and estate were returned during the Restoration in 1660.

Chiefs
 Ranald Bane MacDonald, 1st of Largie
 Donald MacRanald Bane, 2nd  of Largie
 Alexander MacDonald, 3rd of Largie
 Donald MacDonald, 4th of Largie
 John MacDonald, 5th of Largie
 Hector MacDonald, 6th of Largie
 Archibald MacDonald, 7th of Largie
 Alexander MacDonald, 8th of Largie
 Angus MacDonald, 9th of Largie
 John MacDonald, 10th of Largie
 John Ranald Maxwell Macdonald 11th of Largie
 John Ranald Maxwell Macdonald (II)12th of Largie
 Fergus John Logie Maxwell MacDonald (next)

Castles
 Largie Castle, Rhunahaorine
 Largie Castle, Tayinloan

References

 
MacDonald of Largie